State Route 65 (SR 65) is a north–south highway in western Ohio.  Its southern terminus is at State Route 47 near Sidney, and its northern terminus is at its interchange with Interstate 280 in Toledo.  From south to north, the route passes through the cities of Jackson Center, Uniopolis, Lima, Columbus Grove, Ottawa, Leipsic, Belmore, McClure, Grand Rapids, Perrysburg, Rossford, and Toledo.

Route 65 parallels the south bank of the Maumee River for its northernmost 32 miles, from east of Napoleon to Toledo.

History
State Route 65 is an original state highway.  Its original southern terminus was at State Route 15 in Ottawa, and it crossed the Maumee River near Liberty Center, continuing northward to Delta and terminating at the Michigan state line.

In 1931, the route's northern terminus was moved to downtown Toledo along its current route.  Most of its former route north of the Maumee River is now that of State Route 109.  From 1931 until 1989, State Route 65 did not cross the Maumee River.  Until 1964, its route from Perrysburg to Toledo was superseded by U.S. Route 23.

In 1938, State Route 65's southern terminus was extended to its current terminus.  It replaced the now defunct State Routes 33 and 318.

In 1989, when U.S. Route 223 was truncated back to Sylvania, State Route 65 was extended along its former route (along with State Route 51) across the Maumee on the Anthony Wayne Bridge.  State Route 51 took U.S. Route 223's route on Monroe Street, while State Route 65 took the route of Summit Street from there to Interstate 280.

In June, 2007, the Veterans' Glass City Skyway opened, taking Interstate 280 across the Maumee.  Subsequently, State Route 65 was rerouted onto the Robert Craig Memorial Bridge, the former crossing of Interstate 280 across the river, the week after the new bridge opened, ending at the former Front Street interchange.

Major junctions

References

065
Transportation in Shelby County, Ohio
Transportation in Auglaize County, Ohio
Transportation in Allen County, Ohio
Transportation in Putnam County, Ohio
Transportation in Henry County, Ohio
Transportation in Wood County, Ohio
Transportation in Lucas County, Ohio
U.S. Route 23